Commission on Accreditation for Respiratory Care (CoARC) is a non-profit accreditation organization dedicated to Respiratory Care.  CoARC accredits degree-granting programs in respiratory care that have undergone a rigorous process of voluntary peer review and have met or exceeded the minimum accreditation Standards as set by the professional association in cooperation with CoARC. These programs are granted accreditation status by CoARC, which provides public recognition of such achievement. In 2009 there were over 300 accredited programs in the United States.

Collaborating organizations
American Society of Anesthesiologists
American College of Chest Physicians
The American Thoracic Society

See also
American Association for Respiratory Care
National Board for Respiratory Care

References

Respiratory therapy
Non-profit organizations based in Bedford, Texas
School accreditors
Healthcare accreditation organizations in the United States